Zack Knight (born 22 November 1991) is a British singer-songwriter. Formerly known by the stage name, Zeekay (before 2011), Knight is known for songs such as Bom Diggy, Galtiyan, Nakhre and Enemy, the former appearing on a Bollywood comedy.

Life and career
Knight was born in Grimsby, Lincolnshire, England, to a Pakistani-Punjabi mother and an Afro-Asian father. He moved to Haywards Heath in 1999, studying at Oathall Community College, and was present during the visit to the school by the then-Prince Charles. He describes his music as R&B infused style with a crossover sound, with Bollywood and Middle-Eastern influences. Knight cites Michael Jackson, Boyz II Men and Usher as the main inspirations behind his music. He also produces, composes and engineers his own music.  Knight is a multilingual artist, chaining together lyrics in English, Urdu and Punjabi, as well as elements of Arabic and Bengali.

2007–10: The Zeekay Years 
Operating under the stage name 'Zeekay'/'Zee Kay Knight began his career primarily as a songwriter, writing songs for artists such as Tinie Tempah, Ginuwine, Stylo G, IYAZ and various X Factor contestants. His first major success was with writing the hit single "Baby (Dil Deewana)", for US R&B artist Ginuwine, released in 2007. Shortly after, he started producing several R&B/Hip-hop singles himself; his debut single My Moment(Produced by Pcru, Flipnotez), released in 2008, reaching third in the Myspace R&B charts, which consequently led to him landing a production deal with "Mr Skills, creator of Big Brova's, with whom he had been working on his debut album. From here, Knight produced several other singles across the span of 2 years, including "In Denial (which he performed at various Live shows), Love U Right ft Tinie Tempah, Save It and Inspiration.

Knight supported the likes of Taio Cruz, Mario and Jessie J in live concerts and shows. Simultaneously, he was studying for a Degree in Economics, which he had to put on hold in order to concentrate on his musical aspirations. He eventually graduated; however, after 2010, he had to re-brand his music from under his stage name/alias, Zeekay, to under his real name, Zack Knight, as he is still known by now.

2011–14: Re-branding, Covers and Albums 
After 2010, Knight, now operating without his stage name/alias, produced several singles and albums. As a result of the re-branding, he was now working with different artists and producers, therefore his style of music changed, with a less of a focus on hip-hop mainstream music to more of a pop music sound. He received regional and national support from his debut single "All Over Again" in 2012, and his second single "Who I Am" was also featured as one of iTunes "New & Noteworthy" picks of the month, which was followed by his third single "When I'm Gone". (although these three singles later become incorporated into his 2016-released album On Repeat). He was also active in producing his own covers, as well as remixes of popular songs, on his YouTube channel. As well as this, he produced two albums: "Poison In My Sleep" (2014) and "On Repeat" (released 2016, although the songs dated back to 2011-12).

2014–present 
In 2014, Knight signed a deal with T-Series. Under this record label, he produced several popular singles, including songs like "Dheere", "Nakhre", "Enemy", "Looking For Love", and "Tere Naam", most of which topped the BBC Asian Network Charts. He collaborated with various high-profile artists within the BBC Asian Network Industry, including the likes of Raxstar and Jasmin Walia amongst others. He has also collaborated with artists outside the United Kingdom, such as rapper Badshah, playback singer Mohammad Irfan, and American YouTube personality Adam Saleh. After being appointed BBC Music Ambassador in 2017, he successfully sold out both of his own UK headline tours in the following year.

During this period, Knight also wrote and produced "Bom Diggy", featuring Jasmin Walia, amassing over 1.1 billion views on YouTube (as of April 2021). This track also appeared in the Bollywood comedy Sonu Ke Titu Ki Sweety (2018), albeit it being a re-make. This was accompanied by 2 Top 5 peaking singles in the UK R&B iTunes charts ("Ya Baba", "Tears"), 1 Top 10 UK Dance iTunes chart ("Love Controller"), three Consecutive Number ones on the BBC Asian Network Download Chart ("Nakhre", "Lamhe", "Enemy"), and 10 top five singles in the World/Asian Charts.

He createz remixes, mashups and medleys. His remixes typically follow the style of compiling several Bollywood songs and mixing them with English R&B fusion, or making acoustic-type covers and remixes of popular songs or his own songs.

On 28 February 2021, Knight released a new song named "Para Rum Pa", in collaboration with Jernade Miah and Kayes Rashid, on YouTube, reaching over 200k+ views on its release day, and over 1M views within 2 weeks.

On 14 October 2021, Knight released a 3-track album titled 'Dear Dad', in memory of his beloved father, who died in August of 2021. He is currently working on another album, which is due to be released in December of 2021 named 'iamzackknight'. His latest cover is Kahani Suno 2.0 and Bollywood Medley 9.

Discography

Singles

Awards

References

External links

English male singers
English songwriters
English people of Pakistani descent
English people of Punjabi descent
Living people
People from Grimsby
Punjabi-language singers
1991 births
21st-century English singers
21st-century British male singers
Urdu-language singers
British male songwriters